The prostration of recitation (sujud tilawa) is a prostration (sujud) which occurs during the ritual Tilawa of Quran in Salah or outside it.

Presentation

Defining the prostration of recitation (tilawa) as a movement of prostration resulting from the reason that it is a duty or a mustahabb when the recitation reaches one of the verses of prostration.

This Sujud occurs during the Tilawa recitation of the Quran, including Salah prayers in Salah al jama'ah.

Muslim jurists have agreed on the legitimacy of the prostration of recitation, due to the presence of the correct verses and hadiths contained in it, but they differed in the quality of its religious legitimacy whether it was a duty or a delegate.

There are fifteen places where Muslims believe, when Muhammad recited a certain verse (ayah), he prostrated to Allah Almighty.

Religious legality 
Shafi'i and Hanbali jurists are of the view that the prostration of recitation is a  after reciting a verse of the verses of prostration.

And they based their opinion on Āyah: 107 of Surat Al-Isra, in which God (Allah) Almighty says:

A prophetic hadith was also narrated from the companion Abu Hurairah, may God Almighty be pleased with him, in which he said:

Another hadith was also narrated by the companion Abdullah ibn Umar in which he said:

Shafi'i and Hanbali jurists do not consider the prostration of recitation as a duty for them, relying on the fact that Muhammad left it when he recited Surah An-Najm which included a verse of prostration, and he did not prostrate in it.

This was confirmed by the hadith that was narrated by the companion Zayd ibn Thabit, may God Almighty be pleased with him, in which he said:

Conditions

The Muslim jurists stated that the prostration of Quran recitation is required the same conditions as for Salah prayer, like ritual purity, ghusl and wudu or tayammum, facing the direction of qibla, covering the intimate parts in Islam, and avoiding najassa and impurity.

Few jurists also stated that a Muslim who had lost his two purity, meaning ghusl and wudu, should not prostrate in Quran recitation.

If the Maliki jurists had a reputation for saying that it is permissible to prostrate in recitation even if the Muslim lacked a major and minor purity on the basis of the Maliki school of thought, there are some Malikis who chose not to lack that purity, according to two jurisprudential sayings.

In order for the prostration of recitation to be valid, the time for prostration must begin, and this happens according to the majority of jurists by reading or hearing all of the verse of the prostration; If the reciter (qari) prostrates before the end of the verse of prostration, if with one letter, he is not permitted to do that.

The validity of the prostration of recitation requires that the entire verse of prostration be heard, it is not sufficient for the one who is prostrating to hear only the word of prostration on its own.

The listener who wants to prostrate is also required to refrain from corrupting things such as eating, speech and actions that are outside of reverence.

Supplication
Imam Al-Ghazali said that the one who is prostrating in recitation must make supplication (dua) in his prostration in a manner befitting the context and meaning of the verse of prostration he read, and it is also permissible for him to utter tasbih and various dua.

Imam Abu Dawood narrated in his book Sunan Abu Dawood a hadith on the authority of the Mother of the Believers, Aisha bint Abi Bakr, may God be pleased with her, in which she said:

Fiqh opinions on prostration verses

Maliki and Shafi’i jurists (fuqahā) spoke about the number of prostrations in the verses of the Noble Quran.

In Maliki's fiqh, the four verses, from the surahs of Al-Hajj, An-Najm, Al-Inshiqaq and Al-Alaq, do not result in the prostration of recitation from the Qari because the number of prostrations among the Maliki is eleven (11 prostration), of which ten (10 prostrations) are in Ijma.

This is because Imam Malik ibn Anas stated that it is not one of the strengths of prostration, so it is not a place for prostration with the Malikis.

Ibn 'Abd al-Barr said: "This is the saying of Abdullah ibn Umar, Abdullah Ibn Abbas, Said ibn al-Musayyib, Sa'id ibn Jubayr, Hasan al-Basri, Ikrimah al-Barbari, Mujahid ibn Jabr, Ata ibn Abi Rabah, Tawus ibn Kaysan, Malik ibn Anas, and a group of the people of Medina".

It was reported on the authority of Abu Darda that he said: “I prostrate eleven with the Prophet, may God bless him and grant him peace”, in a hadith narrated by Ibn Majah.

And Ibn Abbas narrated: “The Prophet, may Allah’s prayers and peace be upon him, did not prostrate in any of al-Mufassal since he turned to Medina”, in a hadith narrated by Abu Dawood.

Verses of prostration

The Āyats of Sujud Tilawa in the Quran are eleven in the Maliki fiqh, ten of which are defined by the Ijma and applied to Warsh recitation:

1. ۩ Āyah 206, in Surah Al-A'raf.

2. ۩ Āyah 15, in Surah Ar-Ra'd.

3. ۩ Āyah 50, in Surah An-Nahl.

4. ۩ Āyah 109, in Surah Al-Isra.

5. ۩ Āyah 58, in Surah Maryam.

6. ۩ Āyah 18, in Surah Al-Hajj. 

7. ۩ Āyah 60, in Surah Al-Furqan.

8. ۩ Āyah 26, in Surah An-Naml.

9. ۩ Āyah 15, in Surah As-Sajdah.

10. ۩ Āyah 38, in Surah Fussilat.

11. ۩ Āyah 24, in Surah Ṣād (outside of Ijma).

The four remaining Sajadates to close the number of fifteen are located in the Surates of the  going from Surah Qaf to Surah Al-Nas:

12. ۩ Āyah 77, in Surah Al-Hajj. 

13. ۩ Āyah 62, in Surah An-Najm.

14. ۩ Āyah 21, in Surah Al-Inshiqaq.

15. ۩ Āyah 19, in Surah Al-Alaq.

In most Mus'hafs of the Noble Quran these are indicated by the symbol ۩ , with an over-line on the word/s that invoked the Sujud.

Muslims must prostrate once in order to follow the Sunnah (example) of Muhammad and recite any one or more of the following along with Takbir before and after the Sujud.

Gallery

See also

Sujud
Sujud Sahwi
Sujud Shukr
Salah
Salah al jama'ah
Qira'at
Tilawa
Warsh recitation
Malikism
Shafiʽism
Āyah
Surah
List of chapters in the Quran
Juz'
Rub el Hizb

References

Salah terminology
Sujud
Typography
Salah
Warsh recitation
Gestures of respect
Bowing
Kneeling